Boss Nacker (7 July 1988 – 18 November 2021) was a Nigerian Para powerlifter. He was born in Epe, in Lagos state, Nigeria. He competed in the men's 65 kg class and also occasionally in the 72 kg class. At the 2014 Commonwealth Games he competed in the men's 72 kg event where he won a gold medal. Kehinde died 18 November 2021 in Lagos after a brief period of illness.

Achievements: 
2011 – World Championships Silver medalist  
2014 – Commonwealth Games Gold medalist  
2015 – Malaysia World Cup Gold medalist  
2015 – All Africa Games Gold medalist setting an African Record of 214 kg.   
2016 – Rio Paralympics- Broke the World Record twice with lifts of 218 kg & 220 kg   
2017 – Mexico World Championships Gold medalist with another World Record lift of 220.5 kg.
2018 – World Para-Power lifting Championships, Fazza, Dubia. Gold medal with Record breaking lift of 221 kg .  
2018 – Commonwealth Games, Gold Coast, Australia. Silver medalist in +65 kg Para-Power lifting
2018 August – African Para-Power lifting Championships +65 kg Gold medalist
2018 December – Nigerian National Sports Festival +65 kg Silver medalist.

References

1988 births
2021 deaths
Commonwealth Games gold medallists for Nigeria
Commonwealth Games medallists in powerlifting
Commonwealth Games silver medallists for Nigeria
Medalists at the 2016 Summer Paralympics
Nigerian male weightlifters
Paralympic gold medalists for Nigeria
Powerlifters at the 2014 Commonwealth Games
Powerlifters at the 2016 Summer Paralympics
Powerlifters at the 2018 Commonwealth Games
Sportspeople from Lagos
Paralympic medalists in powerlifting
Paralympic powerlifters of Nigeria
Nigerian powerlifters
20th-century Nigerian people
Medallists at the 2014 Commonwealth Games
Medallists at the 2018 Commonwealth Games